This article covers the first series of the MegaMan NT Warrior anime series, known in Japan as . The first series is composed of two parts (called "Areas" in the DVD releases) for a total of 56 episodes. In the English version, only 52 were dubbed (most of which are very out-of-order), and only 48 aired in the United States. This series loosely covers the storylines of the first two Mega Man Battle Network video-games, and also features some characters and elements from the third game (most prominently the N1 Grand Prix tournament).

The original series in Japan ran from March 4, 2002 until March 31, 2003. A few months later, the English version debut on Kids' WB on May 17, 2003. The original run only consisted of fourteen episodes and ended on August 16, 2003. The series started back up with twenty-eight episodes on May 1, 2004, and Kids' WB aired episodes much out of order. Ten more episodes previously skipped were then dubbed and added with Kids' WB's broadcast of the other twenty-eight to be aired as "lost episodes." These episodes aired sporadically until Kids' WB aired their final episode on December 9, 2004.
Kids' WB took two episodes ("There's No 'I' in Team (Part 1)" and "Crimson Flash") that were previously dubbed and combined them with other episodes with similar content. These episodes can be seen in their entirety in the Canadian broadcast and on the DVD releases. Two more episodes ("CutMan Brothers" and "NetBattle of the Hearts") were originally scheduled to air but were later replaced with "sneak peek" airings of the first Axess episode.

Episode list

2002 Japanese television seasons
2003 Japanese television seasons
EXE